Santa Cruz de Óñez was a fort founded by Martín García Óñez de Loyola in May 1594, near the confluence of the Bio-Bio and Laja Rivers on the right bank of the upper reach of the Rele River in Catiray, ten kilometers south of the Bio-Bio. The site was in an elevated location but with a shortage of water. Gold mines were located across the Rele on a stream called Millapoa.

The fort was elevated to the rank of city in 1595 giving it the name of Santa Cruz de Coya, or Millacoya.

Sources
 Atlas de Historia de Chile, Editorial Universitaria,  pg. 48.
  Francisco Solano Asta-Buruaga y Cienfuegos, Diccionario geográfico  de la República de Chile, SEGUNDA EDICIÓN CORREGIDA Y AUMENTADA, NUEVA YORK, D. APPLETON Y COMPAÑÍA. 1899. Pg. 190 Coya

Buildings and structures in Biobío Region
Populated places established in 1594
Colonial fortifications in Chile
1594 establishments in the Spanish Empire